Val × Love is an anime series adapted from the manga of the same title by Ryousuke Asakura. Takashi Naoya directed the series at Hoods Entertainment with Tatsuya Takahashi written the scripts, and Kiyoshi Tateishi designed the characters and TECHNOBOYS PULCRAFT GREEN-FUND composed the music. It aired from October 5, 2019 to December 21, 2019 on AT-X, Tokyo MX, SUN, and BS11. The opening theme is "for..." performed by Rikako Aida, while the ending theme is "Up-Date x Please!!!" in three groups with three versions by the cast of the nine Saotome sisters. Sentai Filmworks has licensed the series and streamed it on Hidive. It ran for 12 episodes.


Episode List

Notes

References

Val x Love